Winterberg is a town in North Rhine-Westphalia, Germany.

Winterberg may also refer to:

Places
Winterberg (Eastern Cape), mountain range in South Africa
Winterberg, Switzerland
Winterberg tunnel, Craonne, France
Winterberg, mountains in Saxony, Germany:
Großer Winterberg
Kleiner Winterberg (Saxon Switzerland)
Winterberg, mountains in Saxony-Anhalt, Germany:
Großer Winterberg (Harz)
Kleiner Winterberg (Harz)
Vimperk, a town in Czech Republic

People
Friedwardt Winterberg (born 1929), German-American physicist and professor
Guido Winterberg (born 1962), Swiss cyclist
Hans Winterberg (1901–1991), Czech-German composer
Lukas Winterberg (born 1988), Swiss cyclo-cross cyclist
Olga Winterberg (1922–2010), Israeli athlete
Philipp Winterberg, German author

Other
Winterberg Commando, a former infantry regiment of the South African Army

See also
Winterburg
Wintersberg (disambiguation)